The Lover's Leap Bridge is a wrought-iron lenticular truss bridge over the Housatonic River located in Lovers Leap State Park in New Milford, Connecticut. Built in 1895 by the Berlin Iron Bridge Company, it is one of the last bridges built by the company and is a particularly ornate example of its work. It was listed on the National Register of Historic Places in 1976 and is now open only for foot traffic.

Description and history
The Lover's Leap Bridge is located south of downtown New Milford, in the northern part of Lovers Leap State Park. It spans the Housatonic River a short way downstream of its confluence with the Still River, and just south of a bridge carrying Still River Drive. It is accessible on foot from parking areas near either end, along the former alignment of Pumpkin Hill Road, which it originally carried. It is a single-span wrought-iron lenticular truss,  in length, resting on coursed stone abutments. Its truss elements are joined by pins. The posts at the ends are topped by urn finials, and the crossing latticework elements at the portal ends are arched and crowned by cresting. Crossing elements of the guard rails are decorated with rosettes.

The bridge was built in 1895 by the Berlin Iron Bridge Company. This was one of the last bridges manufactured by the company out of iron, which had mostly been supplanted by steel as a preferred bridge building material by that time. The bridge was used by both vehicles and pedestrians until 1977, and was closed to vehicular traffic after the crossing just north of the bridge was constructed.

See also
National Register of Historic Places listings in Litchfield County, Connecticut
List of bridges documented by the Historic American Engineering Record in Connecticut
List of bridges on the National Register of Historic Places in Connecticut

References

External links

Connecticut Historic Highway Bridges

Road bridges on the National Register of Historic Places in Connecticut
Historic American Engineering Record in Connecticut
Lenticular truss bridges in the United States
New Milford, Connecticut
Bridges in Litchfield County, Connecticut
National Register of Historic Places in Litchfield County, Connecticut
Bridges over the Housatonic River
Wrought iron bridges in the United States